Jharoda Majra Burari is a census town in North Delhi District in the National Capital Territory of Delhi, India. It is a municipal corporation in New Delhi.
It is divided into three areas:
Jharoda part 01,
Jharoda part 02, and
Jharoda part 03

2013 assembly election 
Sanjeev Jha, from the Aam Aadmi Party elected from Jharoda Majra Burari in 2013 Delhi legislative assembly election.

Demographics
 India census, Jharoda Majra Burari had a population of 13,301. Males constitute 56% of the population and females 44%. Jharoda Majra Burari has an average literacy rate of 66%, higher than the national average of 59.5%: male literacy is 72%, and female literacy is 57%. In Jharoda Majra Burari, 17% of the population is under 6 years of age. Asia's Largest Yamuna Bio Diversity Park is Between Jharoda Majra Burari And Sangam Vihar.

References

Cities and towns in North Delhi district